The House on the River is a 1986 East German drama film directed by Roland Gräf. It was entered into the 36th Berlin International Film Festival.

Cast
 Katrin Saß as Agnes Eckert (as Katrin Sass)
 Sylvester Groth as Heinz Hüsgen
 Manfred Gorr as Jupp Eckert
 Jutta Wachowiak as Mother Voß
 Rolf Hoppe as Director Hüsgen
 Corinna Harfouch as Emmi Voß
 Johanna Schall as Lena Brinken
 Peter Zimmermann as Werner Tiedemann
 Werner Godemann as Schimmelpfennig
 Matthias Schrader as Ferdinand Belz (as Mathis Schrader)
 Arianne Borbach as Lisbeth Voß
 Hermann Beyer as Peter Dressen
 Eckhard Becker as Gestapo Man

References

External links

1986 films
1986 drama films
German drama films
East German films
1980s German-language films
Films directed by Roland Gräf
Films about Nazi Germany
1980s German films